Rome is the surname of:

 Aaron Rome (born 1983), Canadian professional ice hockey defenceman
 Adam Rome, American environmental historian
 Adolphe Rome (1889–1971), Belgian classical philologist and science historian
 Ashton Rome (born 1985), Canadian professional ice hockey winger
 David Rome (1910–1970), English cricketer
 Edith MacGregor Rome (died 1938), British nursing matron and administrator
 Esther Rome (1945–1995), American women's health activist and writer
 Francis Rome (1905–1985), Commandant of the British Sector in Berlin
 Harold Rome (1908–1993), American composer
 Jerry Rhome (born 1942), American football quarterback
 Jim Rome (born 1964), American sports radio talk show host
 Kevin D. Rome (born c. 1966), African-American university administrator
Lewis Rome (1933–2015), American politician and university trustee
 Richie Rome (fl. 1970s), American conductor and producer
 Sébastien Rome (born 1978), French politician
 Sydne Rome (born 1951), American actress

Fictional people
Tony Rome, neo-noir detective